Maria Ciach (7 September 1933 – 25 May 2009) was a Polish sportswoman. She was born in Tomaszów Mazowiecki in Łódź Voivodeship. She competed at the 1952 Summer Olympics in Helsinki, where she placed seventh in women's javelin throw.

References

External links
 Maria Ciach's profile from the Polish Athletics Federation website

1933 births
2009 deaths
People from Tomaszów Mazowiecki
Polish female javelin throwers
Olympic athletes of Poland
Athletes (track and field) at the 1952 Summer Olympics
Sportspeople from Łódź Voivodeship
20th-century Polish women
21st-century Polish women